Carmela Schlegel (born March 9, 1983) is a Swiss former swimmer, who specialized in breaststroke events. She is a single-time Olympian (2004), a double Swiss champion, and a former national record holder in the 100 m breaststroke. Schlegel also played for Uster Wallisellen Swim Club in Uster, under her coach Ralph Müller.

Schlegel qualified for the women's 4×100 m medley relay, as a member of the Swiss team, at the 2004 Summer Olympics in Athens. Teaming with Dominique Diezi (backstroke), Carla Stampfli (butterfly), and Nicole Zahnd (freestyle), Schlegel swam the breaststroke leg and recorded a split of 1:12.04. Schlegel and the entire Swiss team finished the race in seventh place and fifteenth overall with a final time of 4:15.54.

References

External links

Schlegel nimmt ein Timeout 

1983 births
Living people
Olympic swimmers of Switzerland
Swimmers at the 2004 Summer Olympics
Swiss female breaststroke swimmers
People from Chur
Sportspeople from Graubünden
21st-century Swiss women